Kyeok Sul Do (Hangul: 격술도) - also often romanized as Gjogsul - is a martial art created in Democratic People's Republic of Korea (i.e. North Korea) that is practised primarily in the Korean People's Army and its intelligence agencies.

Kyeok Sul Do was also taught to the armies of Eastern European states that were part of the former Warsaw Pact.

History
Etymologically, it is a combination of the roots kyeok - "strike/blow", sul - "art", then do - "way". The martial art of Kyeoksuldo originated from taekkyon and the older Subak martial system that emerged in 420. The martial art proper was developed around 1926, within the resistance group led by Kim Il-Sung to fight against the Japanese.

During the Korean War, Kyeok Sul Do was taught to communist partisans in order to fight off against the more muscular, larger caucasian American and European soldiers.  Further development of Kyeok Sul Do took place with the start of the conflict with South Korea. During the Cold War, North Korea enlisted foreign martial artists to train their troops. General Choi Hong Hi, one of the founding fathers of Taekwondo, was one of such people, when he brought Taekwondo to North Korea in 1979.

According to defector An Myeong-jin, the trainees hit each other's bodies with thick ropes and exercised striking by hitting on concrete and/or a haystack, with reportedly some trainees dying from these exercises.

In the 1980s, there was a North Korean Movie called  "Order-027" that lead to influx of young North Koreans becoming interested in Kyeok Sul Do.

There are martial arts competitions in North Korea built around Kyeok Sul Do. According to historical records referred by Mookas martial arts magazine, "the earlier contests were about the same as boxing, but in 1987's 7th contest, it evolved to the level of kickboxing."

Among North Korea, operatives called "guides" who escort operatives during landing operations, and 24 reconnaissance battalions belonging to the Reconnaissance General Bureau. These sort of operatives are believed to be involved in fushin-sen cases in Japan.

Korean Central Television often broadcasts North Korean soldiers performing Kyeok Sul Do techniques. In addition, North Korean internet sites also distribute videos of demonstrations on YouTube and other media as part of their propaganda efforts.

There are also cases where the militaries of the former Warsaw Pact countries were introduced and taught Kyeok Sul Do. It was adopted by the National People's Army of the German Democratic Republic (East Germany) in 1988, with instructors from the Korean People's Army brought to the country. This began when Colonel-General Horst Stechbarth took a three-week course in the DPRK after negotiations with the Korean People's Army, during which close National People's Army (or NVA) wrestling instructors were trained in Kyeok Sul Do.

Earlier, the martial art was already successfully introduced in the Polish People's Republic. At the same time, the NVA instructors tuned the Kyeok Sul Do and introduced the system as a whole, primarily for the airborne forces like Luftsturmregiment 40. For close quarters training, the Die Nahkampfweste Modell 1985 was used for protection.

Technique
The basic technique is to strike with limbs, and it is said to be a martial art similar to Karate and taekwondo. Gyeoksul's punch uses horizontal fist swing punch without fist rotation. Gyeoksul doesn't have boxing exclusive motions such as uppercut or hook. The style utilizes melee weapons, including knives and blunt weapons.

No specific details on the origins has been revealed, but it is said to be based on the following martial arts and fighting systems:

 Subak - Kyeok Sul Do was originally derived from Korean martial art Subak. In the new Kyeoksul rules & techniques, Gyuksul also resembles Sibak (Korean street fighting games) & Gwonbeop (Muyedobotongji). Those 3 pictures are Gyuksul moves. There are similar moves in Korean Muyedobotongji Gwonbeop, except that Gwonbub's wild swing with shoulder-push uses vertical fist while Gyuksul uses horizontal fist. Those 3 pictures resemble these two 300 years old Korean Gwonbeop pictures.
 Kwon Bop Kong Soo Do (YMCA Kwon Bop Bu) - Yoon Byung-in was forcibly moved to North Korea in August 1950 by his older brother, Yoon Byung-du, a captain in the North Korean Army. In 1966 and 1967, he taught martial arts to North Korean special forces of the Moranbong. In late 1967, Master Yoon completed his assignment and returned to his supervisor position at a concrete factory in Chongjin, where he worked until his death from lung cancer in April 1983.
 Bōgutsuki Karate (Kanbukan) - student of the Kanbukan dojo learnt the art and went to North Korea to teach it. Kyeok Sul Do sparring employs similar protective gear that early Bogu Karate employed.
 Kendokan Karate - the founder of the style is Hideo Nakamura, birthname Kang Chang-Soo and born in Pyongyang. He has taught Karate at Chongryon and it may have carried to North Korea.
 Taekwondo, ITF-style - Choi Hong Hi, the South Korean general that spearheaded the unification of the Kwans, creating Taekwondo, went into exile in conflict with President Park Chung-hee when attempting to bring the art to North Korea in 1972. Eventually, Choi managed to bring Taekwondo to North Korea in 1979. General Choi also chose the North Korean Chang Ung to head the ITF from 2002 to 2015.

Organization
The World Kyeoksuldo Federation (세계 실전 격술 도 총본관) consists of two civilian (non-paramilitary) dojangs in South Korea. One is in Incheon, the other is in Cheonan. Unlike the rest of the commercialized Kyeok Sul Do schools, the emphasis in these schools is on increasing physical strength and body endurance. Modern uniforms are military camouflage with Kyeok sul do patches or black uniforms.

Notes

References

Bibliography
 

Korean martial arts
Military of North Korea
Martial arts in North Korea